NFS, or Nýja fréttastofan, was an Icelandic news service of 365 and a television channel broadcasting news 24 hours a day.

References 

Mass media companies of Iceland